John T. Whitaker (9 April 1886 – 21 May 1977) was a British gymnast who competed in the 1908 Summer Olympics and in the 1912 Summer Olympics. As a member of the British team in 1908 he finished eighth in the team competition. He was part of the British team, which won the bronze medal in the gymnastics men's team, European system event in 1912. In the individual all-around competition he finished 21st.

References

External links
 
John Whitaker's profile at databaseOlympics
John Whitaker's profile at Sports Reference.com

1886 births
1977 deaths
British male artistic gymnasts
Gymnasts at the 1908 Summer Olympics
Gymnasts at the 1912 Summer Olympics
Olympic gymnasts of Great Britain
Olympic bronze medallists for Great Britain
Sportspeople from Birmingham, West Midlands
Olympic medalists in gymnastics
Medalists at the 1912 Summer Olympics